William Randolph Hearst II (born 1942) is one of John Randolph Hearst's sons. Within the family, he is often referred to as Billy. He attended the University of San Francisco and married Jennifer Gooch; they had a son, Jason Hearst. William and Jennifer divorced, and Jennifer married Andrew Rowe, Jr.; she died in 2008.

References

Businessweek; "William Randolph Hearst II and his sisters, Deborah Hearst Gay and Joanne Hearst Castro, complained they weren't given enough access to financial records or enough say in decision-making."
Forbes; "In 1997 grandson W.R. Hearst II, now 58, filed suit in Los Angeles Superior Court against the William Randolph Hearst Family Trust, demanding that its financial records and decision-making be opened to family members.  ... William II ... appears to have no paying job (says his lawyer, John Sturgeon: "He does a lot of travel and manages his investments")."
Time magazine ; Friday, September 23, 1966; "Married. William Randolph Hearst II, 23, grandson of the publisher and a business student at the University of San Francisco; and Jennifer Gooch, 23, an art student; in Manhattan."
New York Times; October 23, 2005; Heather Disbrow Carlton, 33, the daughter of Christina and Merritt Carlton of Fernandina Beach, FL, was married yesterday at the Hearst Ranch in San Simeon, California, to Jason Gooch Hearst, the son of Jennifer Rowe of Hope, Maine, and William Randolph Hearst II of San Luis Obispo, California. ... Mr. Hearst, also 33, graduated from Colby College and is studying for a bachelor's degree in music at the Berklee College of Music in Boston. He is the stepson of Andrew Rowe Jr. ...

William Randolph II
1942 births
Living people
University of San Francisco alumni